World Mayor is a biennial award organized by the City Mayors Foundation since 2004. It intends to raise the profile of mayors worldwide, as well as honour those who have served their communities well and who have contributed to the well-being of cities, nationally and internationally.  The organisers make it plain that the award has no connection with any city or organization and is run on strictly non-commercial lines. Helen Zille and Leopoldo Lopez discussed their 2008 nominations on the BBC World Service programme 'Outlook'. The Guardian looked at contenders for the 2014 prize. The 2018 World Mayor Project was dedicated to women mayors. The 2020 World Mayor Project is dedicated to mayors who have made the relief of poverty one of their top priorities. The winner of the 2021 World Mayor Prize Ahmed Aboutaleb was presented with his award at a ceremony held in the Dutch Senate by its President Jan Anthonie Bruijn.

The 2023 World Mayor Prize will be dedicated to Friendship between Cities. It will be awarded to a mayor and city that have made outstanding contributions to friendship and cooperation between towns and cities at home and across borders.

The City Mayors Foundation commissions the trophy presented as the World Mayor Prize. The trophy was designed by artist Manuel Ferrari and is handmade out of steel by the metalworker Kaspar Swankey.

Notable recipients

Notable winners include (subsequent political offices): Edi Rama (Prime Minister of Albania), Dora Bakoyannis (Greek foreign minister) and Marcelo Ebrard (Mexican foreign minister), while runners-up (or top 10 finalists) have included Andrés Manuel López Obrador (President of Mexico), Job Cohen (Dutch Labour opposition leader), Joko Widodo (President of Indonesia), Gavin Newsom (Governor of California), Leopoldo López (Venezuelan opposition leader), Cory Booker (US Senator) and John Hickenlooper (US Senator and former Governor of Colorado).

Riace (Italy) mayor Domenico Lucano, who came third in the 2010 poll, was arrested in October 2018 on various immigration-related charges.  The mayor of Gdańsk Paweł Adamowicz, who was assassinated in January 2019, had ranked ninth in the 2016 poll.

City Mayors Foundation

The City Mayors Foundation, also known as City Mayors, is an international think tank dedicated to urban affairs. It has been active since 2003 and runs the biennial World Mayor Prize, as well as providing pro bono consultancy services. Unlike Eurocities and United Cities and Local Governments it is wholly independent of any city.

Winners of the World Mayor Prize

Runners up (Commendations)

References

External links
 

World Mayor
Honorary titles
Governance and civic leadership awards
Municipal international relations
World Mayor
Awards established in 2004
Community awards